In mathematics, George Glauberman's Z* theorem is stated as follows:

 Z* theorem: Let G be a finite group, with O(G) being its maximal normal subgroup of odd order.  If T is a Sylow 2-subgroup of G containing an involution not conjugate in G to any other element of T, then the involution lies in Z*(G), which is the inverse image in G of the center of G/O(G).

This generalizes the Brauer–Suzuki theorem (and the proof uses the Brauer–Suzuki theorem to deal with some small cases).

Details
The original paper  gave several criteria for an element to lie outside   Its theorem 4 states:

For an element t in T, it is necessary and sufficient for t to lie outside Z*(G) that there is some g in G and abelian subgroup U of T satisfying the following properties:
 g normalizes both U and the centralizer CT(U), that is g is contained in N = NG(U) ∩ NG(CT(U))
 t is contained in U and tg ≠ gt
 U is generated by the N-conjugates of t
 the exponent of U is equal to the order of t

Moreover g may be chosen to have prime power order if t is in the center of T, and g may be chosen in T otherwise.

A simple corollary is that an element t in T is not in Z*(G) if and only if there is some s ≠ t such that s and t commute and s and t are G-conjugate.

A generalization to odd primes was recorded in : if t is an element of prime order p and the commutator [t, g] has order coprime to p for all g, then t is central modulo the p′-core.

 have also studied an extension of the Z* theorem to pairs of groups (G,  H) with H a normal subgroup of G.

Works cited

 gives a detailed proof of the Brauer–Suzuki theorem.

Theorems about finite groups